The Northeastern League was a minor league baseball league that last played in the 1934 season as an eight–team Class B level league. The 1934 league franchises were based in Connecticut, Massachusetts and New Hampshire. An earlier Northeastern League played as an Independent league in 1887 and 1895 to 1896, with teams based in New York and Vermont.

History
The Northeastern League first played as a minor league in the 1887 season, beginning play on July 6, 1887, with the season concluding on September 5, 1887. The 1887 league was formed as an Independent league, composed of league members Burlington, Malone, Montpelier, Rutland and St. Albans. The 1887 Rutland team won the Northeastern League championship with a 16–6 record managed by James Harmon. The five–team league began play on July 6, 1887 and the Rutland was followed by St. Albans (19–9), Burlington (13–17), Malone (3–10) and Montpelier (2–13) in the final standings. The Burlington, Vermont team was managed by  L.J. Smith  and L.G. Burnham. Malone, New York was managed by Ryder. Montpelier, Vermont was managed by Fred Spaulding and William Lord. The Rutland, Vermont team was managed by James Harmon and St. Albans, Vermont was managed by Hunt. All the 1887 Northeastern League teams would become members of the Northern New York League, which began play in 1900. The Northeastern League played again as an Independent league in the 1895 and 1896 seasons, with teams and standings unknown.

The Northeastern League resumed play in 1934. The league played in 1934 as a Class B level league under the direction of President Roger E. Baker. The Northeastern League began play on May 16, 1934 as six–team league, playing a split–season schedule with members Hartford Senators, Lowell Honeys/Hustlers, Manchester Indians, New Bedford Whalers, Springfield Ponies and Waltham Rosebuds. On May 24, 1934, the Waltham Rosebuds, with a 6–2 record, moved to become the Worcester Rosebuds, playing their first home game in Worcester on June 1, 1934. The Lowell Honeys/Hustlers won the first half standings. At the start of the second half, the Northeastern League expanded to eight teams, adding the Watertown Townines and Cambridge Cantabs as new franchises. On July 17, 1934, Cambridge, with a 1–12 record, moved to become the Wayland Birds. Worcester won the second half standings. In the playoff Finals, Lowell won the championship 4 games to 1 over Worcester.

The Northeastern League permanently folded after the 1934 season. After the season ended, league owner Roger Baker, an accountant, reportedly was convicted of embezzlement from his clients and sentenced to serve time in prison.

Northeastern League cities
Burlington, Vermont: Burlington 1887
Cambridge, Massachusetts: Cambridge Cantabs 1934
Hartford, Connecticut: Hartford Senators 1934
Lowell, Massachusetts: Lowell Honeys/Hustlers 1934
Malone, New York: Malone 1887
Manchester, New Hampshire: Manchester Indians 1934
Montpelier, Vermont: Montpelier 1887
New Bedford, Massachusetts: New Bedford Whalers 1934
Rutland, Vermont: Rutland 1887
Springfield, Massachusetts: Springfield Ponies 1934
St. Albans, Vermont: St. Albans 1887
Waltham, Massachusetts: Waltham Rosebuds 1934
Watertown, Massachusetts: Watertown Townies 1934
Wayland, Massachusetts: Wayland Birds 1934
Worcester, Massachusetts: Worcester Rosebuds 1934

Standings and statistics

1887 Northeastern League

1934 Northeastern League

References

Defunct minor baseball leagues in the United States
Baseball leagues in Connecticut
Baseball leagues in Massachusetts
Baseball leagues in New Hampshire
Defunct professional sports leagues in the United States
Sports leagues established in 1887
Sports leagues disestablished in 1934
Baseball leagues in New York (state)
Baseball leagues in Vermont
1887 establishments in the United States
1934 disestablishments in the United States